Karasjok is a Norwegianized version of the Northern Sami name Kárášjohka.  Either one may refer to the following places:

 Karasjok or Kárášjohka, a municipality in Finnmark county, Norway
 Karasjok (village) or Kárášjohka, a village in Karasjok municipality in Finnmark county, Norway
 Karasjohka or Kárášjohka, a river in Finnmark county, Norway
 Karasjok Church, a church in Karasjok municipality in Finnmark county, Norway
 Old Karasjok Church, a church in Karasjok municipality in Finnmark county, Norway